Lizard Point may refer to:

 Lizard Point, Cornwall, the southernmost point on the British mainland
 Lizard Point (Queensland), a rock outcrop in Australia
 Lizard Point, Antarctica, on the Beardmore Glacier
 "Lizard Point" (composition), an instrumental by Brian Eno, on the album Ambient 4: On Land

See also 
 The Lizard